Sir Walter Raleigh is a 1719 tragedy by the British writer George Sewell. It is based on the downfall of Walter Raleigh a successful courtier and sailor in the reign of Elizabeth who was executed in the reign of her successor James I. It was originally staged at the Lincoln's Inn Fields Theatre, one of the two patent theatres operating in London.

The original cast featured James Quin as Walter Raleigh, Lacy Ryan as Howard, John Leigh as Young Raleigh, John Corey as Salisbury, Christopher Bullock as Gundamor, Thomas Smith as Sir Julius Caesar, John Egleton as Carew, John Ogden as Wade, Anna Maria Seymour as Lady Raleigh and Jane Rogers as Olympia.

References

Bibliography
 Burling, William J. A Checklist of New Plays and Entertainments on the London Stage, 1700-1737. Fairleigh Dickinson Univ Press, 1992.

1719 plays
British plays
West End plays
Tragedy plays
Cultural depictions of Walter Raleigh
Plays based on real people
Plays set in the 16th century
Plays set in the 17th century
Plays set in London